Chad Marshall (born November 24, 1991), known professionally as Rowdy Rebel, is an American rapper from Brooklyn who is signed to GS9 and Epic Records. He is a member of the Brooklyn-based GS9 crew alongside rapper Bobby Shmurda. Rowdy Rebel appeared in Shmurda's video for "Hot Nigga" and was featured on an official remix of the song alongside Fabolous, Chris Brown, Busta Rhymes, Jadakiss, and Yo Gotti.

Early life
Marshall grew up in a neighborhood known as "the 90s" in Brooklyn's East Flatbush area. People in his neighborhood referred to him as "rowdy" as a child, which is the genesis for his stage name. Many members of GS9 (including Shmurda) originated in the same East Flatbush locale. He is of Bajan descent.

Career

Marshall achieved fame in 2014 with the rise of his GS9 cohort, Bobby Shmurda. He was signed to Epic Records in July 2014 just two weeks after Shmurda signed his deal with Epic. Marshall was featured on a remix of Shmurda's hit single "Hot Nigga" with big-name acts like Fabolous, Jadakiss, Chris Brown, Busta Rhymes, and Yo Gotti. Marshall also released several singles, including "Computers" which was featured on GS9's Shmoney Shmurda (Shmixtape). In October 2014, he released a single entitled "Beam Jawn" which did not include any features from the GS9 crew or other artists.

In June 2020, he was featured on the single "Make It Rain" by the late rapper Pop Smoke, marking his first music release in three years. The track debuted at number 51 on the Billboard Hot 100, marking Marshall's first charting single.

Following his release from prison in December 2020, Rowdy was interviewed by Complex and revealed that he was planning on releasing music straight away, however his team convinced him to work more on a forthcoming full-length project, possibly titled Rowdy vs. Rebel. He also stated that he is still signed to Epic Records.

On February 12, 2021, Rowdy Rebel released the single "Jesse Owens", featuring Canadian rapper Nav.

Legal issues
On December 17, 2014, Marshall was arrested by the NYPD for conspiracy, attempted murder, attempted assault, reckless endangerment and criminal possession of a weapon. Bobby Shmurda and 13 others associated with GS9 were also arrested for various charges including drug dealing. Marshall pleaded not guilty to all charges. He pleaded guilty in exchange for a deal that sentenced him to 6–7 years in prison. Due to time served awaiting his trial, Marshall was given almost two years credit for time served. Rebel had a parole hearing scheduled for August 2020, which approved his release in December 2020. Marshall was released from prison after serving 6 years on December 15, 2020. To celebrate his release, fellow rapper Young Thug gave him a YSL chain.

Artistry 
Much of Marshall's music contains references to the block where he grew up. Rowdy has noted that he and other GS9 members talk about friends from the neighborhood "to keep their names alive."

Discography

Mixtapes

Singles

As lead artist

As featured artist

Other charted songs

References

External links
 

Living people
People from Flatbush, Brooklyn
African-American male rappers
Epic Records artists
1991 births
Gangsta rappers
21st-century American rappers
21st-century American male musicians
American people of Jamaican descent
American people of Barbadian descent
21st-century African-American musicians
Criminals from Brooklyn
21st-century criminals
Criminals from New York City
American male criminals
Rappers from Brooklyn